This is a list of cities and towns with over 10,000 inhabitants (or lower if the municipality has over 20,000 inhabitants) in Montenegro. For the full list of populated places, see List of populated places in Montenegro.

List
For a list of municipalities, see Municipalities of Montenegro; for a category, see :Category:Populated places in Montenegro; for a list of all places in Montenegro, see List of places in Montenegro. List of towns with over 10,000 inhabitants or lower if the municipality has over 20,000 inhabitants:

See also
Municipalities of Montenegro
Regions of Montenegro
Populated places of Montenegro
Subdivisions of Montenegro

References

External links

 
Montenegro geography-related lists
Montenegro
Lists of subdivisions of Montenegro